Yuile is a surname. Notable people with the surname include:

Bryan Yuile (born 1941), New Zealand cricketer
David Yuile (1846–1909), Canadian businessman

See also
Yule (surname)